Mónica Rose Alvarado Rodriguez (born 11 January 1991) is an American-born Mexican international footballer who plays for Liga MX Femenil side Pachuca and the Mexico national team. Mainly a defender, she can also operate as a midfielder.

She was a member of the Mexico national team for the FIFA Women's World Cup squads in 2011 and 2015. She also played the 2010 U-20 World Cup.

References

External links
 
 Profile  at Mexican Football Federation
 

1991 births
Living people
Citizens of Mexico through descent
Mexican women's footballers
Women's association football defenders
Mexico women's international footballers
2011 FIFA Women's World Cup players
2015 FIFA Women's World Cup players
Pan American Games competitors for Mexico
Footballers at the 2015 Pan American Games
Sportspeople from Santa Monica, California
Soccer players from California
American women's soccer players
Mississippi State Bulldogs women's soccer players
TCU Horned Frogs women's soccer players
American sportspeople of Mexican descent
Pan American Games bronze medalists for Mexico
Pan American Games medalists in football
Medalists at the 2015 Pan American Games